Nicolas Raskin (born 23 February 2001) is a Belgian professional footballer who plays as a midfielder for Scottish Premiership club Rangers and the Belgium under-21 national team.

Raskin had spells in the youth academies of Standard Liège and Anderlecht, before joining Gent in 2017. He made his competitive debut for Gent in February 2018, becoming the first player born in the 21st century to play in the Belgian Pro League. He re-joined Standard Liège in January 2019 and signed for Rangers four years later.

Raskin has earned 50 caps for Belgium's youth national teams. He has represented the country from under-15 to under-21 level.

Club career
Raskin's first club as a child was Royal Stade Waremmien FC, before playing youth football for Standard Liège from 2008 to 2015. He then spent two years in Anderlecht's youth academy. In May 2017, Raskin left Anderlecht to join Gent, signing a three-year contract. Raskin made his professional debut for Gent at the age of 16, in a 3–0 Belgian Pro League win over Sint-Truiden in February 2018, becoming the first player born in the 21st century to play in the league.

On 23 January 2019, Raskin returned to his former youth club Standard Liège.

On 31 January 2023, Raskin joined Scottish club Rangers on a long-term contract, for an undisclosed transfer fee. He made his debut four days later, in a 2–1 victory over Ross County in the Scottish Premiership.

International career
Raskin has played youth international football for Belgium at under-15, under-16, under-17, under-18, under-19 and under-21 levels.

He represented the Belgium under-17 team at the 2018 UEFA European Under-17 Championship.

Personal life
Raskin was born in Liège. He is the son of Thierry Raskin, who was also a professional footballer in Belgium.

Career statistics

References

External links
 
 Profile at the Rangers F.C. website

2001 births
Living people
People from Waregem
Belgian footballers
Belgium youth international footballers
K.A.A. Gent players
Standard Liège players
Rangers F.C. players
Belgian Pro League players
Association football midfielders
Footballers from West Flanders